Paisley may refer to:

Paisley (design), an ornamental Persian pattern or motif commonly identified with the town of Paisley, Renfrewshire, in west Scotland

People
Paisley (name), including a list of people with the name
Lord Paisley, in the peerage of Scotland

Places
Paisley, Renfrewshire, Scotland, where the Paisley pattern was popularized
Paisley, Florida, United States
Paisley, Oregon, United States
Paisley, Pennsylvania, United States
Paisley, Ontario, Canada
Paisley, Edmonton, Alberta, Canada
Paisley, South Australia
Diocese of Paisley, an ecclesiastical territory of the Roman Catholic Church in Scotland
Paisley Caves, Oregon, United States
Paisley Islet, an islet off Kangaroo Island, South Australia

Other
Paisley (Scottish Parliament constituency)
Paisley (UK Parliament constituency) (1832–1983), corresponding to the Scottish town
Paisley Grammar School, in Paisley, Renfrewshire
Paisley Park, a record label owned by the musician Prince; also the name of his estate
Paisley Terrier, a breed of dog, ancestor of the Yorkshire Terrier
Paisley Underground, a style of 1960s influenced music, usually associated with the 1980s Los Angeles music scene

See also
Paisley by-election (disambiguation)
Paisley North (disambiguation)
Paisley South (disambiguation)
Paisley railway station (disambiguation)

Pasley (disambiguation)